Philpott is an unincorporated community in Henry County, in the U.S. state of Virginia.

History
A post office called Philpott was established in 1900, and remained in operation until it was discontinued in 1958.

Politician A. L. Philpott was born in Philpott.

References

Unincorporated communities in Henry County, Virginia
Unincorporated communities in Virginia